John James Maxwell, 2nd Earl of Farnham (5 February 1759 – 23 July 1823) was an Irish Representative peer and politician.

He was the son of Barry Maxwell, 1st Earl of Farnham and Margaret King. He was known as Shane Rua due to his striking head of red hair. In 1784, he married Grace Cuffe, daughter of Thomas Cuffe, however, they had no children. He succeeded as 2nd Earl of Farnham, 2nd Viscount Farnham and 4th Baron Farnham on 17 October 1800, also inheriting the Farnham estate in Cavan. He commissioned Francis Johnston, a Dublin-based architect, to design an extension to Farnham House.

Maxwell sat as a Member of Parliament (MP) for Cavan County from 1780 until 1783 and again from 1793 until 1800. He was elected a representative peer on 3 March 1816. On his death in 1823, the Earldom and the Viscountcy became extinct, whilst the Barony and the Farnham estate passed to his cousin John Maxwell-Barry

Notes

References 
Kidd, Charles, Williamson, David (editors). Debrett's Peerage and Baronetage (1990 edition). New York: St Martin's Press, 1990., 
 Maxwell family genealogy, part 03. showing the Maxwell of Calderwood, Maxwell of Farnham (co. Cavan), and Maxwell of Finnebrogue families.

External links 
 Cavan County Museum - The Farnham Gallery
 Farnham Estate

|-

1759 births
1823 deaths
Earls in the Peerage of Ireland
Irish MPs 1776–1783
Irish MPs 1790–1797
Irish MPs 1798–1800
Irish representative peers
Members of the Parliament of Ireland (pre-1801) for County Cavan constituencies
4